Annals of Surgical Oncology is a peer-reviewed medical journal published by Springer International Publishing on behalf of the Society of Surgical Oncology. It is an official journal of the Society of Surgical Oncology, and the American Society of Breast Surgeons. The editor-in-chief is Kelly M. McMasters (University of Louisville School of Medicine).

Abstracting and indexing 
The journal is abstracted and indexed in Index Medicus/MEDLINE/PubMed, Current Contents/Clinical Medicine, Excerpta Medica, and the Science Citation Index. According to the Journal Citation Reports, the journal has a 2020 impact factor of 5.344.

References

External links
 
 Society of Surgical Oncology

Oncology journals
Publications established in 1994
Surgical oncology
Surgery journals
Springer Science+Business Media academic journals
English-language journals
Journals published between 13 and 25 times per year